Iain Alan Sutherland Glen (born 24 June 1961) is a Scottish actor. He has appeared as Dr. Alexander Isaacs/Tyrant in three films of the Resident Evil film series (2004–2016) and as Ser Jorah Mormont in the HBO fantasy television series Game of Thrones (2011–2019). Other notable roles include John Hanning Speke in Mountains of the Moon (1990), Larry Winters in Silent Scream (1990) for which he won the Silver Bear for Best Actor from the Berlin International Film Festival, Manfred Powell in Lara Croft: Tomb Raider (2001), Brother John in Song for a Raggy Boy (2003), the title role in Jack Taylor (2010–2016), Sir Richard Carlisle in Downton Abbey (2011), James Willett in Eye in the Sky (2015), and Bruce Wayne in Titans (2019–present).

Early life and education
Glen was born on 24 June 1961 in Edinburgh, Scotland, and educated at the Edinburgh Academy, an independent school for boys (now co-educational), followed by the University of Aberdeen. He then trained in acting at the RADA in London ("because it was the only one that was holding auditions at that particular time"), where he won the Bancroft Gold Medal. His older brother is Hamish Glen, artistic director of the Belgrade Theatre, Coventry and former artistic director of the Dundee Repertory Theatre.

Career
Glen's big screen debut came in the 1988 film Paris by Night alongside Charlotte Rampling and Michael Gambon. The same year he appeared in Gorillas in the Mist with Sigourney Weaver. In 1990, Glen won the Silver Bear for Best Actor at the 40th Berlin International Film Festival for his role in Silent Scream. In the same year he was cast as Hamlet, Prince of Denmark in Tom Stoppard's film adaptation of his play Rosencrantz and Guildenstern Are Dead, which won the Golden Lion at the Venice Film Festival.
In 1998, Glen was nominated for the Laurence Olivier Award for Best Actor for his performance in The Blue Room starring opposite Nicole Kidman. 

in 2002, Glen starred with Emilia Fox in the Italian-French-British romance-drama film The Soul Keeper directed by Roberto Faenza. In 2008 Glen was Samson in the BBC Radio 3 production of Samson Agonistes directed by John Tydeman. 
 
In 2009, It was announced that Glen had joined the cast of the HBO series Game of Thrones, starring as Ser Jorah Mormont a knight in exile from Westeros, who becomes adviser to Daenerys Targaryen (played by Emilia Clarke) when she joins the Dothraki. 

In 2010, he played the role of Father Octavian, leader of a sect of clerics who were on a mission against the Weeping Angels in "The Time of Angels"  and "Flesh and Stone", a two-episode story which formed part of the fifth season of the revived television series Doctor Who (played by Matt Smith). He appeared in the second series of Downton Abbey, as Sir Richard Carlisle, a tabloid publisher who is a suitor to, and subsequently engaged to, Lady Mary. 

From 2010 to 2016 Glen played the title character in the Irish TV crime series Jack Taylor adapted from the novels by Ken Bruen, and set in Galway, Ireland. 

In the 2012 BBC drama series Prisoners' Wives, he plays Paul, the husband of Francesca, whose comfortable life comes crashing down when he is imprisoned for drug trafficking. Also in 2012, he starred in a new four-part BBC Radio 4 adaptation of The Count of Monte Cristo, written by Sebastian Baczkiewicz, directed by Jeremy Mortimer and Sasha Yevtushenko. 

From December 2013 until early January 2014, Glen starred alongside Richard McCabe in Fortune's Fool at the Old Vic, directed by Lucy Bailey.  He had been due to appear in the full run until late February 2014  but was forced to withdraw early to recover from illness, with his role taken by his understudy Patrick Cremin and then by William Houston who joined the cast about the same time as Glen's departure.

In 2019, it was revealed that Glen would be portraying Bruce Wayne on the DC Universe TV show Titans.

In 2023, Glen starred as Magnus MacMillan, in charge of the Kinloch Bravo oil rig in The Rig, in a cast that included Emily Hampshire, Martin Compston and Mark Addy. The same year he starred as William Carr in Operation Napoleon, a thriller directed by Óskar Þór Axelsson and based on Arnaldur Indriðason's best selling book of the same name.

Filmography

Film
{| class="wikitable sortable"
|-
! Year
! Title
! Role
! class="unsortable" | Notes
|-
| rowspan=2|1988
| Paris by Night
| Wallace Sharp
|
|-
| Gorillas in the Mist
| Brendan
|
|-
| rowspan=4|1990
| Mountains of the Moon
| John Hanning Speke
|
|-
| Silent Scream
| Larry Winters
| 
|-
| Rosencrantz and Guildenstern Are Dead
| Hamlet
|
|-
| Fools of Fortune
| William Quinton
|
|-
| 1991
| Ferdydurke'
| Joey
|
|-
| 1993
| The Young Americans
| Edward Foster
|
|-
| 1998
| Mararía| Bertrand
|
|-
| rowspan=2|2000
| Beautiful Creatures| Tony
|
|-
| Paranoid
| Stan
|
|-
| rowspan=2|2001
| Lara Croft: Tomb Raider| Manfred Powell
| 
|-
| Gabriel & Me
| Dad
|
|-
| rowspan=2|2002
| Darkness
| Mark
|
|-
| The Soul Keeper| Dr. Carl Gustav Jung
| 
|-
| rowspan=2|2003
| Song for a Raggy Boy| Brother John
|
|-
| Spy Sorge| Richard Sorge
|
|-
| 2004
| Resident Evil: Apocalypse| Dr. Alexander Isaacs
|
|-
| rowspan=4|2005
| Man to Man
| Alexander Auchinleck
|
|-
| Vagabond Shoes| Alec Murray
| Short film
|-
| Tara Road
| Danny
|
|-
| Kingdom of Heaven
| Richard Cœur de Lion
|
|-
| 2006
| Small Engine Repair| Doug
|
|-
| rowspan=3|2007
| The Last Legion| Orestes
|
|-
| Resident Evil: Extinction| Dr. Alexander Isaacs / Tyrant
|
|-
| Mrs Ratcliffe's Revolution| Frank Ratcliffe
|
|-
| 2008
| Slapper| Red / Michael Simmons
| Short film
|-
| rowspan=3|2009
| Pope Joan
| Village Priest
|
|-
| Harry Brown
| S.I. Childs
|
|-
| The Case of Unfaithful Klara| Denis
|
|-
| 2011
| The Iron Lady| Alfred Roberts
| 
|-
| 2013
| Kick-Ass 2| Uncle Ralph
|
|-
| rowspan=2|2014
| Guy Martin's Spitfire| Narrator (voice)
| Documentary
|-
| Monsters Behind the Iron Curtain| Narrator (voice)
| Documentary
|-
| rowspan=2|2015
| The Bad Education Movie| Pasco
|
|-
| Eye in the Sky| James Willett
|
|-
| rowspan="2"|2016
| Resident Evil: The Final Chapter| Dr. Alexander Isaacs
|
|-
| Dusty and Me| Mickey the Bubble
| 
|-
| 2017
| My Cousin Rachel| Nick Kendall
| 
|-
| rowspan="3"|2019
| The Flood| Philip
|
|-
| The Fabric of You | Isaac (voice)
| Short film
|-
| Isabel | Colin
| Short film
|-
| rowspan="3" |2020
| The Windermere Children| Jock Lawrence
| 
|-
| The Racer| Sonny
|
|-
| Black Beauty| John Manly
| 
|-
| 2021
| Tides| Gibson
|
|-
|2022
|The Lost Girls 
|Hook
|
|-
|2023
|Operation Napoleon 
|William Carr
|
|-
| TBA
| style="background:#FFFFCC;"|What About Love 
| American Ambassador
| Post-production
|}

Television

Selected theatreEdward II, Royal Exchange, Manchester 1986The Man Who Had All the Luck Bristol Old Vic 1990Hamlet, Bristol Old Vic, 1991Macbeth (1993) Henry V (1995)Martin Guerre (1996–1997) The Blue Room (1998) A Streetcar Named Desire (2002)Hedda Gabler (2005)The Crucible (2006)Scenes of a Marriage (2008)Wallenstein (2009, Minerva Theatre, Chichester) – title roleSeparate Tables (2009) – roles of Mr Martin and Major Pollock – Chichester Festival TheatreGhosts (2010) – also directedUncle Vanya, The Print Room, 2012 – title roleFortune's Fool, The Old Vic, 2013The SeagullHereKing LearCoriolanusShe Stoops to ConquerHapgoodRoadSmall Engine RepairThe Recruiting OfficerLove From A Stranger''

Awards and nominations

References

External links

 
 
 

1961 births
Living people
20th-century Scottish male actors
21st-century Scottish male actors
Alumni of RADA
Alumni of the University of Aberdeen
Audiobook narrators
Male actors from Edinburgh
People educated at Edinburgh Academy
Royal Shakespeare Company members
Scottish male film actors
Scottish male Shakespearean actors
Scottish male stage actors
Scottish male television actors
Silver Bear for Best Actor winners